Following are the results of the Ukrainian Football Amateur League 2008 season.  Participation is restricted to the regional (Oblast) champions and/or the most regarded team by the respective regional association.

This season competition consisted of two stages. The first stage was organized in regional principal and was played in two rounds where each team could play another at its home ground. On the first stage each group winners and the best runner-up advanced to the next part of the competition automatically, the other four runners-up were paired together to identify two more teams that were to advance. Sokil Zolochiv that won the play-off and was accepted for the finals at the end was not able to arrive to play. The second stage and the concluding was played in Chernivtsi where the teams were split in two groups and the first places were advancing to the final.

Teams

Returning

Debut
List of teams that are debuting this season in the league.

BRB-VIK Volodymyr-Volynskyi, Sokil Zolochiv, PTP Dunaivtsi, Karpaty Yaremche, Horyzont Koziatyn, Polissia-2 Zhytomyr, Zenit Boyarka, Zirka Kyiv, Desna-2 Chernihiv, Kholodnyi Yar Kamianka, Ametyst Oleksandriya, Torpedo Mykolaiv, Myr Hornostayivka, Chornomornaftohaz Simferepol, Illich Osypenko, Dnipro-75 Dnipropetrovsk

Withdrawn
List of clubs that took part in last year competition, but chose not to participate in 2008 season:

 Halychyna Lviv
 Avanhard Sutysky
 Zirka Kirovohrad
 Bryz Izmail

 Tsementnyk Yamnytsia
 OLKAR Sharhorod
 FC Velyka Bahachka
 Syhma Kherson

 Budfarfor Slavuta
 Antares Obukhiv
 Ivan Odesa
 Donbas-Krym Donetsk

Location map

First stage
Note: Some records are not full.

Group A

Note: Last two games of Sokil Berezhany were forfeited.

Group B

Note: Polissya-2 Zhytomyr is the youth sport-school of the disbanded professional team Polissya Zhytomyr.

Group C

Group D

Group E

Second stage
Sokil Zolochiv decided not to participate any further.

Group 1

Group 2

Championship match

Ukrainian Football Amateur League seasons
Amateur
Amateur